Basilia is a genus of bat flies in the family Nycteribiidae.

Species within this genus are:

Basilia afghanica
Basilia aitkeni
Basilia anceps
Basilia anomala
Basilia ansifera
Basilia antrozoi
Basilia barbarae
Basilia bathybothyra
Basilia benkingi
Basilia bequaerti
Basilia boardmani
Basilia borneensis
Basilia carteri
Basilia compar
Basilia constricta
Basilia corynorhini
Basilia costaricensis
Basilia currani
Basilia daganiae
Basilia dubia
Basilia dunni
Basilia echinata
Basilia eileenae
Basilia endoi
Basilia falcozi
Basilia ferrisi
Basilia ferruginea
Basilia fletcheri
Basilia forcipata
Basilia glabra
Basilia hamsmithi
Basilia handleyi
Basilia hispida
Basilia hughscotti
Basilia hystrix
Basilia indivisa
Basilia italica
Basilia japonica
Basilia jellisoni
Basilia juquiensis
Basilia kerivoulae
Basilia limbella
Basilia lindolphoi
Basilia madagascarensis
Basilia major
Basilia manu
Basilia mediterranea
Basilia meridionalis
Basilia plaumanni
Basilia mimoni
Basilia mirandaribeiroi
Basilia mongolensis
Basilia monocula
Basilia musgravei
Basilia myotis
Basilia nana
Basilia nattereri
Basilia neamericana
Basilia nodulata
Basilia nudior
Basilia ortizi
Basilia pectinata
Basilia peruvia
Basilia pizonychus
Basilia plaumanni
Basilia pudibunda
Basilia punctata
Basilia quadrata
Basilia robusta
Basilia rondanii
Basilia rugosa
Basilia rybini
Basilia saccata
Basilia seminuda
Basilia sierraleonae
Basilia tarda
Basilia techna
Basilia tenuispina
Basilia tiptoni
Basilia transversa
Basilia travassosi
Basilia triseriata
Basilia truncata
Basilia truncatiformis
Basilia victorianyanzae
Basilia wenzeli

References 

Parasitic flies
Nycteribiidae
Wingless Diptera
Hippoboscoidea genera
Taxa named by Alípio de Miranda-Ribeiro